The Shahabuddin Ahmed Cabinet led the Interim Government of Bangladesh from 6 December 1990 to 20 March 1991.

List of Advisors

References

Cabinets of Bangladesh
Cabinets established in 1990